Kevin Debaty (born 12 June 1989) is a Belgian footballer who currently plays for Liège as a goalkeeper.

External links

1989 births
Living people
Belgian footballers
Association football goalkeepers
K.A.S. Eupen players
A.F.C. Tubize players
R.C.S. Verviétois players
K. Patro Eisden Maasmechelen players
Royal Antwerp F.C. players
S.K. Beveren players
RFC Liège players
Belgian Pro League players
Challenger Pro League players